The 2002 Women's Australian Hockey League was the 10th edition women's field hockey tournament. The tournament was held in various cities across Australia, and was contested from 2 March through to 14 April 2003.

NSWIS Arrows won the tournament for the seventh time after defeating QLD Scorchers 4–2 in the final. Canberra Strikers finished in third place after defeating Adelaide Suns 3–2 in the third and fourth place playoff.

Participating teams

 Canberra Strikers
 NSWIS Arrows
 Territory Pearls
 QLD Scorchers
 Adelaide Suns
 Tassie Van Demons
 VIS Vipers
 WAIS Diamonds

Competition format
The 2002 Women's Australian Hockey League consisted of a single round robin format, followed by classification matches. 

Teams from all 8 states and territories competed against one another throughout the pool stage. At the conclusion of the pool stage, the top four ranked teams progressed to the semi-finals, while the bottom four teams continued to the classification stage.

The first four rounds of the pool stage comprised two-legged fixtures between states. As a result, matches in rounds five to seven of the pool stage were worth double points, due to the single-leg format.

Point allocation

Every match in the 2003 AHL needed an outright result. In the event of a draw, golden goal extra time was played out, and if the result was still a draw a penalty shoot-out was contested, with the winner receiving a bonus point.

Results

Preliminary round

Pool

Fixtures

Classification round

Fifth to eighth place classification

Crossover

Seventh and eighth place

Fifth and sixth place

First to fourth place classification

Semi-finals

Third and fourth place

Final

References

External links
Hockey Australia

2002
2002 in Australian women's field hockey
Sports competitions in Adelaide